Denis Streker (born 6 April 1991) is a German footballer who plays for Eintracht Frankfurt II as a midfielder.

References

External links
 
 
 

Living people
1991 births
German footballers
Association football midfielders
SV Wehen Wiesbaden players
Eintracht Frankfurt II players
TSG 1899 Hoffenheim players
TSG 1899 Hoffenheim II players
SV Ried players
SV Gonsenheim players
Dynamo Dresden players
FSV Frankfurt players
Bundesliga players
2. Bundesliga players
3. Liga players
Austrian Football Bundesliga players
Sportspeople from Mainz
Footballers from Rhineland-Palatinate
SC Hessen Dreieich players
Hessenliga players